Denintuzumab mafodotin (INN; development codes SGN-19A or SGN-CD19A)  is a humanized monoclonal antibody-drug conjugate designed for the treatment of CD19-positive acute lymphoblastic leukemia and B-cell non-Hodgkin lymphoma. It consists of an anti-CD19 mAb linked to monomethyl auristatin F (MMAF), a cytotoxic agent. This drug was developed by Seattle Genetics.

Denintuzumab refers to the anti-CD19 antibody, and mafodotin refers to MMAF and the chemical linkage.

Clinical trials
The drug is in phase I clinical trials.
Preliminary phase I results for B-cell malignancies, including diffuse large B-cell lymphoma (DLBCL) and B-lineage acute lymphocytic leukemia (B-ALL) were presented at the ASH medical conference Dec 2015.

Phase 2
A separate randomized phase 2 trial started in 2015 to evaluate SGN-CD19A in combination with R-ICE chemotherapy for second-line DLBCL. A phase 2 clinical trial in front-line DLBCL is started in 2016. Both trials were terminated by the sponsor based on portfolio prioritization.

References 

Antibody-drug conjugates
Experimental cancer drugs
Monoclonal antibodies for tumors